Muñomer del Peco is a municipality located in the province of Ávila, Castile and León, Spain. According to the 2006 census (INE), the municipality has a population of 128 inhabitants.

References

External links
 Official Website of Ayuntamiento de Muñomer del Peco

Municipalities in the Province of Ávila